Khaled Nazzal was the central committee secretary of the Democratic Front for the Liberation of Palestine and a militant leader for the Palestinian Liberation Organisation. 
Born in Qabatiya, Jenin in 1948, he joined the Palestinian forces in 1967, and in 1971 he joined Damascus University.

Nazzal was "a leader" of the Ma'alot Massacre, a 1974 terrorist attack that saw 22 Israeli schoolchildren and their three teachers killed following a two-day hostage standoff. In June 2017, a public square in Jenin was named for Nazzal, drawing sharp criticism from Israeli Prime Minister Benjamin Netanyahu.

Nazzal was married to women's rights activist Rima Nazzal. He was assassinated in Athens, Greece, on 9 June 1986 by Mossad agents.

References

Palestine Liberation Organization members
1986 deaths
People killed in Mossad operations

People from Qabatiya